Emmy Helene Worm-Müller (born Emmy Helene Hornemann, May 3, 1875 – August 23, 1950) was a Norwegian actress.

Career
Worm-Müller starred in some of the earliest Norwegian silent films. Worm-Müller made her debut in 1911 in Fattigdommens forbandelse and then occasionally appeared in films until the 1940s. Her last film role was in 1942, in Rasmus Breistein's Trysil-Knut. In addition, Worm-Müller was a theater actress engaged with the Oslo New Theater and Trøndelag Theater.

Family
Worm-Müller was the daughter of Johan Lebrecht Hornemann (1846–1928), an infantry captain in the Trondheim Brigade, and his wife  Helene Sophie Thrane (1842–1905). She was born at the Vestre Fagerli farm in Bakkaunet in the perish of Lade. When she was confirmed, the family was living in the Qvalegården building at Dronningens gate 30 in Trondheim. She was married to the journalist Jacob Worm-Müller (1866–1911), and they were the parents of Helene Ulrikke Amalie Hornemann Worm-Müller and Anna Maria Hornemann Worm-Müller.

Filmography
 1911: Fattigdommens forbandelse
 1911: Bondefangeri i Vaterland as Agurka, a prostitute
 1912: Hemmeligheden as the fisherman's wife
 1924: Til sæters as Kari
 1927: Syv dager for Elisabeth as Josefine Hansen, the foster mother
 1933: En stille flirt as Marte
 1938: Bør Børson Jr. as Hilda, Bør's wife
 1939: De vergeløse as Flugum's wife
 1942: Trysil-Knut as an old woman

References

External links

1875 births
1950 deaths
20th-century Norwegian actresses
Actors from Trondheim